Mohla Khurd or Mohlān Khurd is a village of Gujrat District, Punjab, Pakistan It is located at 32°30'5N 74°4'10E. - 8 km away from the district capital Gujrat also 1.5 km north from river Chenab.
Khurd and Kalan Persian language word which means small and Big respectively when two villages have same name then it is distinguished as Kalan means Big and Khurd means Small with Village Name.

References

 

Populated places in Gujrat District